Butirosin is an aminoglycoside antibiotic complex which is active against both Gram-positive and Gram-negative bacteria.  It is a mixture with butirosin A (80-85%) and butirosin B being the major components.

References 

Aminoglycoside antibiotics